Glenn Thomas (born September 12, 1977) is an American football coach who most recently was the offensive coordinator and quarterbacks coach at Arizona State University. He was previously the offensive coordinator and quarterbacks coach at the University of Nevada, Las Vegas.

Personal life and education 
A native of Eastland, Texas, Thomas attended Eastland High School before attending Texas Tech University. He graduated from Texas Tech in 1998 with a degree in Exercise and Sports Science, and earned a master's degree from Midwestern State University in education in 2004. He and his wife Felicia have two children, Hayden and Dylan.

Coaching career

Early coaching career 
Thomas began his coaching career at his alma mater Texas Tech as a student assistant from 1998 to 2001, before becoming a graduate assistant at Midwestern State. He worked with the wide receivers during his time as the team's graduate assistant. He served one season as the passing game coordinator and quarterbacks coach for the Mustangs before being promoted to offensive coordinator in 2005.

Atlanta Falcons 
Thomas left the Mustangs to join the Atlanta Falcons on newly hired head coach Mike Smith's coaching staff. He spent 4 seasons as an offensive assistant before being promoted to the team's quarterbacks coach in 2012.

Return to college 
After Falcons head coach Mike Smith was fired, Thomas was not retained by Dan Quinn. Thomas was then hired by Matt Rhule to coach quarterbacks for Temple. Marcus Satterfield, Temple's offensive coordinator shifted from coaching quarterbacks to running backs after the hire of Thomas. After Satterfield was hired to be the next head coach at Tennessee Tech, Thomas was promoted to offensive coordinator. 

After Rhule was hired to be the next head coach at Baylor in 2017, Thomas joined him as the Bears' co-offensive coordinator and quarterbacks coach, sharing coordinator duties with Jeff Nixon. After Rhule left Baylor to be the head coach of the Carolina Panthers in 2020, Thomas was hired by newly hired Memphis head coach Ryan Silverfield to be a senior offensive analyst, a role he held for two months.

When UNLV's passing game coordinator and quarterbacks coach Danny Langsdorf left to accept an assistant coaching position at Colorado, Thomas was hired as the team's offensive coordinator and quarterbacks coach on April 23, 2020.

After Zak Hill resigned from Arizona State following several allegations of recruiting violations, Thomas was announced as offensive coordinator and quarterbacks coach on January 31, 2021.

References

External links 
 UNLV Rebels bio

1977 births
Living people
People from Eastland, Texas
Texas Tech Red Raiders football coaches
Midwestern State Mustangs football coaches
Atlanta Falcons coaches
Temple Owls football coaches
Baylor Bears football coaches
UNLV Rebels football coaches